Robert Barron was an English locksmith notable for his invention of the double–acting tumbler lock in 1774, patented the same year. At the time of the patent, he lived in the city of London.

References

Locksmiths
Year of birth missing
Year of death missing
Place of birth missing
18th-century inventors